XEMBC-AM is a radio station on 1190 AM in Mexicali, Baja California, Mexico. It is owned by Grupo Cadena and is currently silent.

History
XEYW-AM received its first concession on November 16, 1964. It was owned by Mario Marcos Mayans, the founder of Cadena Baja California and broadcast as a 250-watt daytimer. By the end of the decade the callsign had been changed to XEMBC-AM.

On May 22, 2022 XEMBC-AM went off the air and its programming is online-only.

References

Radio stations in Mexicali